Glider is the eighth studio album by Japanese band Tokio. It was released on February 19, 2003. The album reached fifth place on the Oricon weekly chart and charted for six weeks.

Track listing

References 

2003 albums
Tokio (band) albums